Mammen Mathew (born 20 September 1944) is present Chief Editor and Managing Director of Malayala Manorama. He is the eldest son of the late K. M. Mathew, who was the Chief Editor of Malayala Manorama until 1 August 2010. Mathew has more than 45 years of experience in the field of publication.

Career
Mathew completed a BA and MA in Medieval Indian History St. Stephen's College in Delhi, and then worked as trainee in editing in The Times of India. Subsequently, he joined Malayala Manorama as its Delhi correspondent. In 1968, he became a reporter for the Western Mail (Wales) in Cardiff in the United Kingdom. He also worked at The Sunday Times in London, under Harold Evans. Mathew joined the Oklahoma City Times, and later worked for The Daily Oklahoma as reporter in 1969. In 2010, he succeeded his father, K. M. Mathew, as Chief Editor of Malayala Manorama.

Awards
 2005 — Padma Shri in the field of Literature & Education, awarded by the Government of India.
 2014 — Lokmanya Tilak National Award for Excellence in Journalism, instituted by Kesari-Mahratta Trust.

References

Recipients of the Padma Shri in literature & education
1945 births
St. Stephen's College, Delhi alumni
Journalists from Kerala
Malayali people
Living people